Alex Meruelo (born March 27, 1964) is a Cuban-American billionaire who holds business interests in banking, real estate, media, restaurants, food, casinos, and professional sports. He is the owner of Meruelo Group, as well as Meruelo Media, which owns five radio stations and two television stations in Los Angeles. In addition he is the owner of Fuji Food, two casinos, the Grand Sierra Resort in Reno, Nevada and the Sahara Las Vegas in Las Vegas and is the majority owner of the Arizona Coyotes of the National Hockey League.

Biography 
Meruelo was born in New York City. His parents were accountants who fled the Castro regime. His family moved to Los Angeles, California, where they held a bridal shop and invested in local real estate. He also started to invest in real estate at an early age, and eventually sold a plot of land in Riverside to Walmart, making him a millionaire in his early 20s.

Meruelo attended the Don Bosco Technical Institute in Rosemead, California, and received his B.S. from California State University, Long Beach.

Career 
Meruelo began his career in his father's tuxedo business. At the age of 23, he decided to open a new type of pizza restaurant catering to Latinos in the US and offering unusual toppings such as chorizo and jalapeños. He bought a failing pizza restaurant, and called his new business La Pizza Loca. Within 5 years, La Pizza Loca opened 12 locations and reached $10 million in sales.

Meruelo expanded his business focus, founding the Meruelo Group, which has grown into a construction and real estate development firm. Meruelo Group has ownership of Neal Electric Corp, Select Electric Inc., and Doty Bros within the Southern California area. The group also owns Commercial Bank of California. which Meruelo co-founded in 2003, television stations KWHY-TV and KBEH, radio stations KLOS, KLLI, KPWR, KDAY and KDEY-FM under the Meruelo Media banner, and the Grand Sierra Resort in Reno, Nevada.

Meruelo purchased food manufacturer and the largest provider and distributor of pre-packaged sushi in the United States Fuji Food in 2009.

In September 2011, Meruelo announced a $25 million investment in the renovation of the Grand Sierra Resort in Reno, Nevada.

In February 2013, the Meruelo Group made a bid to buy Donald Trump's Trump Plaza Hotel and Casino for $20 million. The deal fell through and the casino closed the following year.

The SLS Las Vegas (formerly the Sahara Hotel and Casino) in Las Vegas, Nevada, was purchased by the Meruelo Group in June 2017. Alex Meruelo plans to turn the casino into a favorite destination for the Hispanic community. Meruelo plans to use its media properties to advertise the casino and its events. In May 2019, SLS brand owner SBE Hotel Licensing, LLC filed a lawsuit alleging that Meruelo's Las Vegas Resort Holdings, LLC had failed to pay at least $450,000 in licensing fees since November 2018. On June 28, 2019, The Meruelo Group and Alex Meruelo announced plans to rename the SLS Hotel as The Sahara Las Vegas. On August 29, 2019, the Meruelo Group officially changed the SLS Hotel to Sahara Las Vegas and is located on Sahara Blvd.

Professional sports 
In November 2011, Meruelo's bid to take ownership of the Atlanta Hawks of the National Basketball Association from the team's then owners Atlanta Spirit was turned down. The team was later sold to Tony Ressler in 2015. In June 2019, he purchased majority ownership of the Arizona Coyotes of the National Hockey League from previous sole owner Andrew Barroway who retained a minority stake. With his purchase of the Coyotes, Meruelo became the first Latino owner in the NHL.

Real estate 
In May 2008, Meruelo purchased a 8,500-square-foot, $7.05 million house at 36 Indian Creek Drive in Miami. In March 2014, he acquired a $10.79 million penthouse in The Langham, New York. In June 2018, he purchased Colom Island in Spain for 3.2 million euros.
In June 2021, Meruelo purchased a 22,000-square-foot, $12.1 million house in Paradise Valley, AZ.

References

External links 
 Meruelo Group official website

American real estate businesspeople
American construction businesspeople
American food industry businesspeople
American businesspeople in mass media
American radio executives
Arizona Coyotes owners
California State University, Long Beach alumni
American people of Cuban descent
Businesspeople from New York City
1964 births
Living people
National Hockey League owners
20th-century American businesspeople